Boulder City Municipal Airport  is a public use airport located one nautical mile (2 km) southwest of the central business district of Boulder City, in Clark County, Nevada, United States. In operation since 1990, it is owned by Boulder City Municipality.

As per the Federal Aviation Administration, this airport had 300,553 passenger boardings (enplanements) in calendar year 2008, 194,838 in 2009, and 169,923 in 2010. The National Plan of Integrated Airport Systems for 2011–2015 categorized it as a primary commercial service airport.

Although many U.S. airports use the same three-letter location identifier for the FAA and IATA, Boulder City Municipal Airport is assigned BVU by the FAA and BLD by the IATA (which assigned BVU to Beluga Airport in Beluga, Alaska).

History
Boulder City Municipal Airport opened on July 2, 1990. It replaced Boulder City Airport, which operated from 1933 into the 1980s. The prior airport was located north of the current airport, much closer to U.S. Route 93.

On March 19, 2009, the Boulder City Aerocenter, a new  terminal, opened to service Papillon Grand Canyon Helicopters, Grand Canyon Airlines and Grand Canyon Scenic Airlines.

Facilities and aircraft
Boulder City Municipal Airport covers an area of 530 acres (214 ha) at an elevation of 2,203 feet (671 m) above mean sea level. It has two runways with asphalt surfaces: 9/27 is 5,103 by 75 feet (1555 x 23 m) and 15/33 is 3,852 by 75 feet (1,174 x 23 m).

For the 12-month period ending February 1, 2011, the airport had 100,025 aircraft operations, an average of 274 per day: 70% air taxi, 30% general aviation, and <1% military. At that time there were 234 aircraft based at this airport: 77% single-engine, 13% helicopter, 9% multi-engine, 1% ultralight, and <1% jet.

Airlines and destinations

Sightseeing tours of the Grand Canyon are operated by Papillon Grand Canyon Helicopters, Las Vegas Helicopters, Scenic Airlines and 5 Star Helicopter Tours.

Statistics

References

External links
 
 Boulder City Automated Weather Observation Station
  from Nevada DOT
 Aerial image as of May 1994 from USGS The National Map
 
 

Airports in Clark County, Nevada
Buildings and structures in Boulder City, Nevada
Airports established in 1990
1990 establishments in Nevada